The 2019–20 Pyramids season is the 11th season in the football club's history and 3rd consecutive and 4th overall season in the top flight of Egyptian football, the Egyptian Premier League, having been promoted from the Egyptian Second Division in 2017. In addition to the domestic league, Pyramids are also participating in this season's editions of the domestic cup, the Egypt Cup and the second-tier African cup, the CAF Confederation Cup. The season covers a period from 1 July 2019 to 30 June 2020.

Kit information
Supplier: Adidas
Sponsors: Swyp

Players

Current squad

Out on loan

Transfers

Competitions

Overview

Egyptian Premier League

League table

Results summary

Results by round

Matches
The fixtures for the 2019–20 season were announced on 12 September 2019.

Egypt Cup

Pyramids entered the competition from the round of 32 and were given a home tie against Egyptian Second Division side Nogoom. The bracket of the tournament was also decided at the time of the round of 32 draw; meaning that the path to the final for each time was decided prior to playing any matches. Also, all matches are played on stadiums selected by the Egyptian Football Association starting from the round of 16.

CAF Confederation Cup

Pyramids entered the competition for the first time in their history after finishing 3rd in the previous season of the league. Since it was the club's first appearance, Pyramids entered the competition from the preliminary round.

Preliminary round 

The draw for the preliminary round was held on 21 July 2019. Pyramids were drawn against Étoile du Congo from Congo.

First round 

The draw for the first round was held on 21 July 2019 (after the preliminary round draw). Pyramids were drawn against the winner of the tie involving CR Belouizdad from Algeria and AS CotonTchad from Chad, which was won by the former.

Play-off round 

The draw for the play-off round was held on 9 October 2019. Pyramids were drawn against Young Africans from Tanzania, who were transferred to the CAF Confederation Cup from the CAF Champions League after losing their tie in the first round.

Group stage

The draw for the group stage was held on 12 November 2019. Pyramids were drawn in Group A alongside FC Nouadhibou from Mauritania, Enugu Rangers from Nigeria and fellow Egyptian side Al Masry.

Quarter-finals

The draw for the quarter-finals was held on 5 February 2020. Pyramids were drawn against Zanaco from Zambia.

Statistics

Appearances and goals

! colspan="11" style="background:#DCDCDC; text-align:center" | Players transferred out during the season
|-

|}

Goalscorers

Clean sheets

References

Notes

Pyramids